1958–59 Manitoba Junior Hockey League season

League notes
The Brandon Wheat Kings return after a four-year absence.
Wayne Larkin (Braves) equals a league record by scoring 6 goals in a game.
The League announced that since league standings cannot be effected, the balance of the 32 game regular season is cancelled.

Regular season

Playoffs
Semi-Finals
Braves defeated Brandon 3-games-to-none 
St. Boniface defeated Transcona 3-games-to-none with 1 game tied
Turnbull Cup Championship
Braves defeated St. Boniface 4-games-to-1
Western Memorial Cup Semi-Final
Braves defeated Fort William Canadiens (TBJHL) 4-games-to-1
Western Memorial Cup Final (Abbott Cup)
Braves defeated Flin Flon Bombers (SJHL) 4-games-to-2
Memorial Cup Championship
Braves defeated Peterborough TPT Petes (OHA) 4-games-to-1

Awards

All-Star Teams

References
Manitoba Junior Hockey League
Manitoba Hockey Hall of Fame
Hockey Hall of Fame
Winnipeg Free Press Archives
Brandon Sun Archives

MJHL
Manitoba Junior Hockey League seasons